Auxiliary (or ancillary) sciences of history are scholarly disciplines which help evaluate and use historical sources and are seen as auxiliary for historical research. Many of these areas of study, classification and analysis were originally developed between the 16th and 19th centuries by antiquaries, and would then have been regarded as falling under the broad heading of antiquarianism. "History" was at that time regarded as a largely literary skill. However, with the spread of the principles of empirical source-based history championed by the Göttingen School of History in the late 18th century and later by Leopold von Ranke from the mid-19th century onwards, they have been increasingly regarded as falling within the skill-set of the trained historian.

Auxiliary sciences of history include, but are not limited to:

 Archaeology, the study of human activity through the recovery and analysis of material culture
 Archaeography, the study of ancient (historical) documents (antique writings)
 Archival science, the study and theory of creating and maintaining archives
 Chorography, the study of regions and places
 Chronology, the study of the sequence of past events
 Cliometrics, the systematic application of economic theory, econometric techniques, and other formal or mathematical methods to the study of history
 Codicology, the study of books as physical objects
 Diplomatics, the study and textual analysis of historical documents
 Encyclopaedistics, the study of encyclopaedias as sources of encyclopaedic knowledge
 Epigraphy, the study of ancient inscriptions
 Genealogy, the study of family relationships
 Heraldry, the study of armorial devices
 Numismatics, the study of coins 
 Onomastics, the study of proper names 
 Palaeography, the study of old handwriting
 Paleoanthropology, the study of human evolution and ecology through the fossil record
 Phaleristics, the study of military orders, fraternities, and award items
 Philately, the study of postage stamps
 Philology, the study of the language of historical sources
 Prosopography, the investigation of a historical group of individuals through a collective study of their lives
 Sigillography (or sphragistics), the study of seals
 Toponymy, the study of place-names
 Vexillology, the study of flags

See also 

 Library of Congress Classification:Class C -- Auxiliary Sciences of History

References 

Historiography
Fields of history